Joan F. Kessler (born 1944) is an  American lawyer and a retired judge of the Wisconsin Court of Appeals, serving from 2004 to 2020. Kessler previously served as United States Attorney for the Eastern District of Wisconsin under President Jimmy Carter.

Life and career
A native of Louisiana, Kessler graduated from the University of Kansas in 1966 and from Marquette University Law School in 1968. She worked as a law clerk for United States District Judge John W. Reynolds, Jr., in Milwaukee from 1968-69 before entering private practice. Kessler was a supporter of Jimmy Carter's candidacy for the Democratic presidential nomination in 1976; in 1978, Carter appointed her United States Attorney for the Eastern District of Wisconsin.

As United States Attorney, Kessler received praise for her performance in court and her open-door policy toward criminal defense attorneys, but clashed with Milwaukee City Attorney James Brennan over her investigation into the Milwaukee Police Department's hiring and promotion practices. She resigned in March 1981, following Carter's 1980 defeat to Ronald Reagan, and entered private practice with the Milwaukee firm Foley and Lardner. Kessler specialized as a divorce attorney at Foley and Lardner and was eventually selected as a partner in the firm.

In 2004, Kessler challenged incumbent Wisconsin Court of Appeals Judge Charles B. Schudson for his seat on the court's Milwaukee-based District I. The campaign was hotly contested; Kessler's campaign alleged that Schudson had committed several violations of judicial ethics, charges he vehemently denied; Schudson later levied ethics allegations against Kessler. Kessler unseated Schudson in the April general election, but was not cleared of ethical wrongdoing until 2010.

Kessler has participated in several notable cases during her tenure as an appellate judge. In December 2014, she authored a decision affirming the conviction of Kelly Rindfleisch, deputy chief of staff to Wisconsin Governor Scott Walker when he served as Milwaukee County Executive. In July 2015, Kessler wrote a concurring opinion in a decision reinstating Milwaukee's employee residency rules, which had been voided by a Milwaukee County circuit judge.

Electoral history

Wisconsin Court of Appeals (2004, 2010, 2016)

| colspan="6" style="text-align:center;background-color: #e9e9e9;"| General Election, April 6, 2004

| colspan="6" style="text-align:center;background-color: #e9e9e9;"| General Election, April 6, 2010

| colspan="6" style="text-align:center;background-color: #e9e9e9;"| General Election, April 5, 2016

References

Marquette University Law School alumni
University of Wisconsin–Madison faculty
Marquette University faculty
United States Attorneys for the Eastern District of Wisconsin
University of Kansas alumni
Wisconsin Court of Appeals judges
Living people
Date of birth missing (living people)
Place of birth missing (living people)
21st-century American judges
1944 births
21st-century American women judges
American women academics